Krishna (Sanskrit: ,  in IAST, pronounced  (Classical Sanskrit) and  in Vedic Sanskrit is a Hindu deity worshipped across many traditions of Hinduism in a variety of different perspectives. In Hinduism, Krishna is recognized as the complete and eighth incarnation of Vishnu, or as the Supreme God (Svayam Bhagavan) in his own right.

As one of the most popular of all Hindu deities, Krishna has acquired a number of epithets, and absorbed many regionally significant deities, such as Jagannatha in Odisha and Vithoba in Maharashtra. The Hindu texts portray him in various perspectives: a lovable infant, a divine child, a prankster, a cowherd, a model lover, a divine hero, a diplomat, a king, a kingmaker, a selfless friend, a philosopher, charioteer to Arjuna and a dispenser of spiritual discourse, as in the Bhagavad Gita. Among the principal scriptures that discuss Krishna's legend are the Mahabharata, the Harivamsa, the Srimad Bhagavatam, and the Vishnu Purana. The Vishnu Sahasranama, the list of Vishnu's thousand names, also includes many of the titles and names of Krishna.

Epithets 
In popular culture, Krishna is often associated with 108 names. The following is a list of fifty of among the most popular names, titles, and epithets associated with the deity Krishna:

See also 
 Names of God in Hinduism
 Svayam Bhagavan
 Bhagavan

References

Bibliography

External links 

Krishnamrita stotra: 108 Names of Krishna as found in Brahmanda Purana 3.36; English translation by G. V. Tagare
108 Names of Krishna
Astottara-satanamas (108 names): Krishna devanagari mp3 audio
Sahasranamas (1000 names): Krishna, Gopala, Balakrishna, Radha-Krishna
List of more names of Lord Sri Krishna